Sullivan High School is located in Sullivan, Moultrie County, Illinois, United States. It is a part of Community Unit School District 300. The school draws students from the towns of Sullivan, Allenville, and Kirksville.

History
Sullivan High School was founded as Sullivan Township High School. The first yearbook “The Retrospect” was created by the Senior class of 1913. Sullivan has been accredited for over 100 years starting in 1917.

Academics
Sullivan High School as of 2018 is ranked the 93rd best High School in Illinois out of 670 Illinois High Schools. Sullivan High School is also recognized in national rankings.

Athletics
Sullivan’s High School athletics participate in the Central Illinois Conference and are members of the Illinois High School Association.

Boys
Baseball
Basketball
Cross Country
Football
Golf
Swimming & Diving
Track & Field

Girls
Basketball
Cheerleading
Cross Country
Golf
Softball
Swimming
Track & Field
Volleyball

Notable team state finishes
Boys Baseball: 1997–98 (2nd)
Boys Golf: 1979–80 (3rd)
Boys Track & Field: 1985–86 (2nd)
Girls Basketball: 1990–91 (1st), 1991–92 (2nd)
Girls Track & Field: 2013–14 & 2014–15 (3rd)
Scholastic Bowl: 1992–93 & 2000–01 (4th)

Extracurricular activities
Band
Bass Fishing
Color Guard
FCA
FCCLA
FFA
Mirror Images
NEHS
NHS
Scholastic Bowl
Singers/Singers Jr./Chorus
Spanish Club
Student Council

Notable alumni
 Albert J. Beveridge (1881), American historian and US senator
 Steve Buxton (1980), former NFL player 
 Tiny Hill (1924), bandleader
 Harold Pogue (1912), All-American football player

See also
List of high schools in Illinois

External links
 School Website

References

Public high schools in Illinois
Education in Moultrie County, Illinois